The 1975 Cork Senior Football Championship was the 87th staging of the Cork Senior Football Championship since its establishment by the Cork County Board in 1887. The draw for the opening round fixtures took place on 26 January 1975. The championship began on 6 April 1975 and ended on 21 September 1975.

Nemo Rangers entered the championship as the defending champions.

On 21 September 1975, Nemo Rangers won the championship following a 4-12 to 0-07 defeat of Dohenys in the final. This was their third championship title overall and their second title in succession.

Nemo's Dinny Allen was the championship's top scorer with 5-13.

Team changes

To Championship

Promoted from the Cork Intermediate Football Championship
 Bishopstown

Results

First round

Second round

Quarter-finals

Semi-finals

Final

Championship statistics

Top scorers

Overall

In a single game

Miscellaneous

 Na Piarsaigh recorded their first ever championship victory since promotion to the senior grade in 1967.
 Dohenys qualified for the final for the first time since 1897.

References

Cork Senior Football Championship